Thomas F. Murphy (born 1939) is an American author who began writing after he retired from the CIA in 1992. He served in Brazil (1973-1975), Hungary (1977-1979), Zaire (1983-1986), and France (1989-1992).

His novel Edge of Allegiance is considered "insider" spy fiction. The novel is the fictional postmortem of a failed Cold-War human intelligence (HUMINT) operation that the author calls the Bagatelle case.

References

Living people
American spy fiction writers
1939 births
American male novelists
People of the Central Intelligence Agency
20th-century American novelists
20th-century American male writers